Zeritu Kebede (born 19 February 1984) is an Ethiopian singer, songwriter and actress. A prominent figure in modern Ethiopian music, her songs often incorporate rock and gospel music.

Early life 
Zeritu Kebede was born in Addis Ababa on 19 February 1984. Her father Kebede Woldegiorgis was an architect and her mother Engida Mitiku was a housewife, who was thirty years younger than her husband.

Kebede grew up in Gulele Area in northern Addis Ababa. She was brought up in a strict manner and isolated from the other children of the neighborhood. However, Kebede spent most of her summers at her maternal grandparents who were very liberal and very close to their neighbors. There, Kebede got the opportunity to meet and play with kids from families with different social statuses.

As a young girl in a quiet house in Gulele, Kebede read books voraciously, listened to country stories suggested by the house helps, played and watched football with her brother and spent time on trees watching birds and the neighborhood beyond the fences, in pursuit of entertainment. But music was what entertained and resonated with her the most. She went through her parents' collection of records and cassettes and listened to anything she found interesting. From her parents collections were, her father's favorites Nat King Cole, Kassa Tessema, Mahmud Ahmed and others; her mother's collections of artists like Tom Jones, Muluken Melesse, and Donna Summer.  She also collected cassettes which introduced her to artists like Michael Jackson, Whitney Houston, Celine Dion, Michael Bolton, Boyzone, Tracey Chapman and Bob Marley.

Kebede attended Lazarist Catholic elementary school.

Career 
Kebede became interested in music since she was a young. She went on stage for the first time while she was a fifth grader, singing a Michael Jackson's song, "Will You Be There". Later, she started writing songs and short plays with her friends and performing them. That is the time she decided that it is what she wanted to do for the rest of her life. While still in high school, Kebede and her friends made their first money from "Yegeterua Emebet", a song they co-wrote and performed, which was to be made a sound track for a program on ETV on the issue of early and forced marriage, although the program never aired for unknown reasons.

After high school, Kebede decided to start singing professionally. Through her connection with Henok Mehari, a singer and keyboard player, she went on to join Sweet Band. But after only one gig at the Famous Lion's club the band was replaced. Kebede then auditioned to join the renowned Express Band, and was hired. At Express Band, Kebede played songs of Celine Dion, Tracey Chapman, Mariah Carey, Lauryn Hill, Shania Twain, Norah Jones and Shakira, among others, at several events and clubs.

While working at Express Band, Kebede was going to Adama University, located 100 kilometers outside of Addis Ababa. But After half a semester, Kebede dropped out and decided to fully focus on her career. She started taking private guitar class and joined Holy-Land Art academy, where she was trained in acting and script writing for a year and a half.

Zeritu then auditioned successfully for a role in a television drama series to be directed by the renowned Ethiopian director, Abate Mekuria. Although the drama she auditioned for never aired, she performed in another play written and directed by Abate Mekuria and took part in the East African Theater Festival held in Mombasa, Kenya.

While working on her own debut album at Begena Studio, Kebede was offered a part on a group song that was being produced for raising awareness on HIV/AIDS. The song "Mela", written by Mikael Belayneh and Yilma Gebreab and produced by Elias Melka (whom she met through their mutual friend and her guitar coach, Zekarias Getahun), involved singers like Menilik Wosinachew, Alemayehu Eshete, and Tamrat Mola.

Music career 
After eighteen months in the studio, in September 2005, Kebede's self-titled album Zeritu was released. The album that included songs like "Endaygelegne", the first single from the album Athidibign, her youth favorite, "Deg Abate Kifu Balua", a song which was critically praised for its lyricism and Kebede's personal favorite Yane, became one of the most successful albums in the history of Ethiopian music.

From March 2006 to April 2006, Kebede went on a national tour Guzo Zeritu and performed in major Ethiopian cities including Addis Ababa, Adama, Hawassa, Dire Dawa, Harar, Bahir Dar, Jimma, Mekelle, Dessie and Gondar. The tour was the first of its kind and also included another famous singer Abinet Agonafir who wrote and performed "Akal le Akal" a duet with Kebede for her debut album. The tour was backed by the Mehari Brothers Band, which was founded by Henok Mehari.

Kebede played an important role in the production of Eyob Mekonnen's debut album released in 2007. She wrote the songs "Tiwedegnalech" and their duet from the album Yene Qonjo. Kebede also wrote Eyob's single "Yefikir Akukulu" which was released later.

Kebede then toured the United States with the Mehari Brothers and played on a few stages in Europe and in the UAE.  She also started experimenting with jazz and acoustic bands and performed on several stages.

Jean Albert Levier, the director of the environmental documentary Les syndrome du titanic has used Kebede's song "Yane" as the sound track for his film, which is based on the best selling book of the well-known French ecologist Nicolas Hulot.

Kebede released "Artificial" in 2014. The song was released in various platforms; it was released in Amazon and Google Play Store on 2 August 2014. In August 2014, "Demo Yewend Konjo" was released. On 20 April 2017, Kebede released "Wushetam" from album Eza Alkerem. It is influenced by jazz ballad.

On 9 March 2018, Kebede released "Love Love Love", featuring Xola Malik and Scott Krippayne from an album of the same name. The song's music video shows two children then young adults playing in friendly and it interpolates meaning of love.

On 22 December 2018, "Azmari" was released, with 303,197 views in video sharing website YouTube shortly after. The music video features various musicians cameo appearance like Jano Band's members Dibekulu Tafesse and Hailu Amelga, Betty G, Henok Mehari, Lij Mikael and Dan Admasu.

Kebede collaborated with Oromo singer Tadele Gemechu and released "Lib Yaleh" on 24 October 2019 through Minew Shewa Entertainment. The song internationally acclaimed and issued on UNICEF for conveyance of maternal mortality in rural community. The music video was directed by Daniel Tamrat produced by UNICEF Ambassador Thomas T. Gobena.

Kebede has been featured artist of Sofia Shibabaw's single "Yeselam Sew Neñ", released on 24 April 2020, along with ensemble musicians like Chachi Tadesse, Betty G and Israel Abel. In June 2020, she announced on her Facebook account that she would release an album called Negat.

Kebede held an organized concert behind closed door called Negat Concert on 23 August 2020. The concert has been live streamed through state TV channels. It is believed the biggest concert during COVID-19 pandemic.

Film career 

In December 2012, Kebede picked on her career in acting and film production when she began the production of the film Kemis Yelebesku Elet. Later released on 12 January 2014. Kebede co-wrote, produced and acted in the film, and wrote and performed the sound track song of the film Alehu, produced by the renowned Abegaz K. Shiota who also scored the film's music.

In the film, Kebede plays a slightly tom-boyish college girl who refuses to date stating it is a waste of time since we all really are alone. The character eventually finds love and gets in touch with her femininity that nature initially intended. The film has been a national success, being acclaimed by viewers and by critics.
Kebede's second acting role came when she wrote acted in Taza, released in October 2017.

Kebede's third film, Pagumen 7, which she wrote was released theatrically in June 2017.

Personal life 
Kebede has been married to Lakachew Mengistu since 2005. She is a mother of three boys.

Kebede's husband, Lakachew Mengistu, a football player and a business man, is son of the Ethiopian football player and coach Mengistu Worku.

Faith 
Zeritu is born-again Protestant Christian. Most of her song incorporated with reverence to God. She believes in "just following Jesus Christ and striving to live according to the Word of God."

Discography 
Studio albums
 Zeritu (2005)
 Artificial (2014)
 Eza Alkerehum (2017)
 Love Love Love (2018)
 Azmari Negn (2018)
 Negat (2020)

References 

1984 births
Living people
20th-century Ethiopian actresses
21st-century Ethiopian women singers
21st-century Ethiopian actresses
Ethiopian human rights activists
Ethiopian philanthropists
Ethiopian screenwriters
Women rock singers
Ethiopian film actresses
Ethiopian humanitarians
People from Addis Ababa
Musicians from Addis Ababa